Ionosat Micro is a Ukrainian satellite mission.

The head scientific organization is the Space Research Institute of NAS of Ukraine and SSA of Ukraine.

General information 
"Ionosat-Micro" Mission realized under the National purpose scientific and technical space program of Ukraine.

Particular project tasks:

Project partners

The history of the project 
Formation of the scientific objectives of the project "Ionosat - Micro" was for a long time, and conceptual provisions were first formulated in the 1990s, during the development of unrealized mission "Warning." Then, after tragic Spitakskii earthquake (1988), the political leadership of the USSR initiated the development of new, more effective methods of earthquake prediction, based, in particular, on the use of non-traditional for Seismology approaches such as observation of ionospheric harbingers of earthquakes etc. Thus arose the idea of mission "Warning", which, if not collapse of the USSR (1991), could be the most ambitious satellite project in the history of world studies of the ionosphere. The "Ionosat-Micro" Mission on the satellite "Mikrosat-M" embodies the ideas of the mission "Warning" on modern scientific and technological basis.

For the diagnosis of electromagnetic processes in ionospheric plasma in the "Ionosat-Micro" Mission will be used complex instrument MWC, developed by Lviv Centre                                                    of Space Research Institute. Experimental testing elements MWC was conducted space experiments "Variant" in the Ukrainian remote sensing satellite "Sich-1M" (2004). To measure the parameters of the ionosphere gas - concentration and temperature neutral and ionized gases - is a complex instrument DN - DE, established in Institute of Technical Mechanics. Flight testing sensors DN and DE experiment was carried out in "Potential" in the Ukrainian remote sensing satellite Sich-2 (2012). In the "Ionosat-Micro" Mission involving foreign partners: Research Center is instrument RFA creator and Space Research and Technology Institute is instrument ID-2 creator.

The satellite launch was planned for 2018. As of May 2019, work is go on.

Spacecraft and orbit 

"Ionosat-Micro" scientific instrumentation set is installed on the satellite platform «Microsat-M»  designed by Yuzhnoye State Design Office to conduct scientific and technological experiments. Ideas for the satellite launching into orbit are processed.

"Ionosat-Micro" scientific instrumentation 
Scientific instrumentation onboard "Microsat-M" designation:

General characteristics of «Ionosat-Micro» scientific instrumentation set:
 weight < 20 kg 
 power consumption < 51 W
 data downstream up to 6 GB per day

«Ionosat-Micro» scientific instrumentation set:

Sources 

Satellites of Ukraine